Alticus sertatus is a species of combtooth blenny found in coral reefs in the western central Pacific Ocean around the nations of Fiji and Tonga.

References

sertatus
Taxa named by Samuel Garman
Fish described in 1903